Savenaca Baledrokadroka (born 20 May 1999) is a Fijian footballer who plays as a midfielder for Australian club Frankston Pines and the Fiji national team.

Club career
Baledrokadroka started his career in the youth of Rewa. In 2017 he made his debut for the first team. In the first half of 2019 he moved to Nasinu. However, he performed so well for the team that Rewa took him back after half a year. In January 2020 he moved, together with fellow countrymens Peni Tuigulagula, Tito Vodowaqa and Asaeli Batikasa to Australian based club Frankston Pines.

National team
In 2018 Baledrokadroka was called up by coach Christophe Gamel for the Fiji national football team. He made his debut on July 5, 2018, in a 1–0 loss against Malaysia. He came in for Mitieli Namuka in the 34th minute of play. In 2019, he was selected for the 2019 Pacific Games. Fiji won a bronze medal.

References

Fijian footballers
Association football defenders
Rewa F.C. players
Fiji international footballers
Living people
1999 births